Hope Christian College (formerly Craigmore Christian School until October 2014) is Christian co-educational, independent private school  in Craigmore, a northern suburb of Adelaide, South Australia in the Playford district. It teaches students from Reception to Year 12. The school now has about 650 students, with a capacity of up to 800.

History
The Craigmore Christian School was established in 1980 as an affiliation of the Craigmore Christian Church. It changed its name to Hope Christian College on 29 October 2014.

Principal George Sears served from 1981-2005. Sandra Jesshope served as Principal from 2006-2010. In 2011, Dominic Hopps took over this role.

Logo and motto
The new logo from October 2014  has a shield with four quadrants separated by a cross. The open Word of God represents the hope of the Gospel; the key represents the opportunity to open closed doors; the Southern Cross represents Australia, the land of promise; the mortar board represents academic excellence.

The old school motto was "Educating for Eternity" and now is "Hope Opportunity Promise Excellence" (HOPE). The old emblem comprised a rising sun (meaning a brighter future), the Word of God as an open book (relating to Christian education), Crux (Australian heritage and the cross), skeleton key (relating to teachers finding the key for each student) and mortar board (education and graduation) with the words in a banner below "Hope, Opportunity, Promise". A once-off school emblem was created in 2000 celebrating 20 years of the school and the old design was used up until 2014.

Sport

There are three communities (houses) derived from the names of Christian missionaries involved in efforts known as Operation Auca; Fleming (blue), Saint (green) and Elliot (red).

Academics
Curriculum includes Accelerated Christian Education (ACE) for primary and middle school students, and Vocational Educational Program (VET) for Senior Students along with the South Australian Certificate of Education (SACE). There has been involvement with various state and national competitions and initiatives such as Rostrum Voice of Youth, Tournament of Minds, Premier's Reading Challenge, Scholastic book club, and the South Australian Primary Schools Amateur Sports Association (SAPSASA) competition. The school won the Happy Little Vegemites Awards in 2000 as part of a Vegemite promotion, presented by James Blundell.

All students in years 5-12 attend camps in various Australian locations such as Wellington, Wirraway Homestead, Port Hughes, Flinders Ranges, Kangaroo Island, Canberra, Victor Harbor and Aldinga Beach. Other locations for excursions include Adelaide Zoo, Adelaide Symphony Orchestra, and the Adelaide Botanic Gardens.

See also
List of schools in South Australia
Craigmore (disambiguation)

Notes and references

External links
Craigmore Christian School website
Craigmore Christian Church website
Happy Little Vegemites Competition entry

Private secondary schools in Adelaide
Private primary schools in Adelaide